The Lone Hand Texan is a 1947 American Western musical film directed by Ray Nazarro and starring Charles Starrett, Mustard, Gravy, Smiley Burnette, John Cason, and George Chesebro. The film was released by Columbia Pictures on March 6, 1947.

Plot

Cast
Charles Starrett as Steve Driscoll / The Durango Kid
Mustard as Musician Mustard (as Mustard and Gravy)
Gravy as Musician Gravy (as Mustard and Gravy)
Smiley Burnette as Smiley Burnette
John Cason as Henchman (uncredited)
George Chesebro as Scanlon (uncredited)
Jim Diehl as Strawboss (uncredited)
Art Dillard as J.E. Clark aka Lefty (uncredited)
Herman Hack as Well Worker (uncredited)
Robert Kellard as Boomer Kildea (uncredited)
Mary Newton as Mrs. Clarabelle Adams (uncredited)
Maudie Prickett as Hattie Hatfield (uncredited)
Raider as Durango's Horse (uncredited)
Matty Roubert as Henchman (uncredited)
George Russell as Henchman (uncredited)
Fred F. Sears as Sam Jason (uncredited)
Charles Soldani as Wildcatter Pledging Money (uncredited)
Jasper Weldon as Stagecoach Driver (uncredited)
Blackie Whiteford as Well Worker (uncredited)

References

External links

1940s Western (genre) musical films
American Western (genre) musical films
1947 films
American black-and-white films
Columbia Pictures films
Films directed by Ray Nazarro
1940s American films
1940s English-language films